Methanocella paludicola is a methane-producing archaeon, the type species of its genus. It was first isolated from rice paddy soil, and is mesophilic and hydrogenotrophic, with type strain SANAET (=JCM 13418T =NBRC 101707T =DSM 17711T).

References

Further reading

Bartlett, Edward J. Structural and functional characterisation of the Nonhomologous End-Joining proteins of the archaeon Methanocella Paludicola. Diss. University of Sussex, 2013.

External links

LPSN
Type strain of Methanocella paludicola at BacDive -  the Bacterial Diversity Metadatabase

Euryarchaeota
Archaea described in 2008